Dietschibergbahn was a funicular railway at Lucerne, Switzerland. The line lead from the city to Dietschiberg at 628 m. The hill, 210 m above Lake Lucerne, was also known as "Little Rigi" (Kleiner Rigi). The line had length of 1240 m and an incline between 9 and 25%. The funicular with two cars had a single track with a passing loop.

At the upper station, there was a restaurant and a railroad model installation.

After the restaurant burned down in 1977, the funicular ceased operations in September 1978. Despite efforts by the association Pro Dietschibergbahn and the company DBB-Betriebs AG, it was never revived.

The funicular had been owned by Dietschibergbahn AG. The company was wound up from 1999 to 2002. The lower station was converted into a private home.  The cars were donated to the Swiss Museum of Transport.

Location of stations:
Lower: 
Upper:

Further reading

References 
 

Territet-Mont Fleuri
Transport in Lucerne
Metre gauge railways in Switzerland
Railway lines opened in 1912
Railway lines closed in 1978

de:Dietschibergbahn